Kraskovo is a rural locality (a village) in Denisovskoye Rural Settlement, Gorokhovetsky District, Vladimir Oblast, Russia. The population was 3 as of 2010.

Geography 
Kraskovo is located 21 km southwest of Gorokhovets (the district's administrative centre) by road. Krasnaya Yablon is the nearest rural locality.

References 

Rural localities in Gorokhovetsky District